Volume-controlled ventilation may refer to:

 Volume controlled continuous mandatory ventilation
 Volume controlled intermittent mandatory ventilation

See also 

 Mechanical ventilation
 Modes of mechanical ventilation
 Respiratory therapy

Respiratory therapy